This is a list of flag bearers who have represented Singapore at the Olympics.

Flag bearers carry the national flag of their country at the opening ceremony of the Olympic Games.

See also
Singapore at the Olympics

References

Singapore at the Olympics
Singapore
Olympic flagbearers
Olympic flagbearers